Stanley G. Edmondson (10 August 1922 – 1977) was an English footballer who played as a winger.

Career
Born in Bacup, Edmondson played for Bacup Borough, Bradford City and Rossendale United.

For Bradford City he made 3 appearances in the Football League.

Sources

References

1922 births
1977 deaths
English footballers
Bacup Borough F.C. players
Bradford City A.F.C. players
Rossendale United F.C. players
English Football League players
Association football wingers
People from Bacup